The Benefactor is an American reality television show broadcast on ABC starting on September 13, 2004.  The premise involved 16 contestants vying to win US$1 million from billionaire entrepreneur and Dallas Mavericks owner Mark Cuban.

In late March and early April 2004, ABC held open auditions for the show in Atlanta, Boise, Boston, Dallas and Las Vegas and also accepted auditions by mail.

The show and its format were kept tightly under wraps during its filming, which began on April 30, 2004 in Dallas, Texas.  Mark Cuban purposefully kept details about the show to a minimum, revealing only a small bit of information about the show on his personal blog during filming. Dallas journalists, eager to learn what was going on, routinely compiled sightings of Benefactor film crews around town.

However, the show proved to be extremely unpopular and suffered from very low ratings, despite leading into the popular Monday Night Football. The show also suffered from ABC stations in NFL markets (such as WBAY in Green Bay and Buffalo's WKBW-TV) moving the show to a timeslot after Jimmy Kimmel Live! or another night entirely due to local sports shows devoted to NFL coverage or local pre-game shows in the pre-MNF slot.  Episode three had only 4.9 million viewers, the network's least-watched show of that week.  Episode four did even worse, with only 4.05 million viewers and finished sixth in its time slot among 18- to 49-year-olds.

The series was widely seen as a copycat and derivative of The Apprentice, a popular show of the time that was hosted by Donald Trump. The Benefactor debuted about nine months after The Apprentice did, though The Benefactor focused more on offbeat and unconventional tasks that weren't directly related to business, as opposed to The Apprentice's commerce-related tasks. The Benefactor also offered a straight cash prize as opposed to an apprenticeship with salary.

Contestants

The show
Cuban said specifically that he would give the $1 million prize to the person that demonstrated that they had the skills that Cuban deemed necessary to be successful.  Each game or test involved throughout the show was designed specifically by Cuban to require the contestants to demonstrate these skills.

Week 1 (September 13, 2004)
In the first week, Mark Cuban invited the sixteen contestants to a Dallas mansion to begin the game.  As the contestants arrive, Cuban watches them and their interactions with the others through closed-circuit cameras.  Once everyone has arrived, Cuban joins the group and announces that one of them has already failed the first test: you don't get a second chance to make a first impression.  Cuban then proceeded to eliminate Richard, who Cuban believed had called the game "stupid" (In reality, he actually said that he didn't 'think ['The Benefactor'] was 'going to be one of those stupid shows.')

The next part of the game involved Cuban interviewing each of the contestants.  He did so with the purpose of determining whether or not the contestants could live up to the expectations that Cuban had from them from their applications.  From the interviews, Cuban sent Laurel home because she wouldn't play air guitar during her interview, a contrast to her application video where she checked her mail in the nude.  Cuban then deliberated between sending William and Grayson home, but had a difficult time deciding, so he decided to have the two play a game of Jenga to determine who would stay by challenging their ability to handle pressure.  Grayson was able to hang in the game for a while, but William eventually won and Grayson was eliminated.

Week 2 (September 20, 2004)
In the second week of the program, Cuban chose three of the remaining thirteen contestants to be "captains."  The captains would then select three people to be on their team and the thirteenth would be eliminated.  Linda selected Chris, Kevin and Spencer, Dominic selected Tiffaney, Femia and Christine and Shawn selected Latane, William and Mario.  Kathy, the thirteenth contestant, was then eliminated from the game.

It was then announced that the three teams would be given several hours of Mark Cuban's time and $2,500 with the specific instruction of doing something that would not waste Mark's time.  Linda's team was the first to go in the morning.  They take Cuban to the Scottish Rite Children's Hospital in Dallas to visit the patients, but they realize they made a mistake when they realize that Cuban was a regular visitor to the hospital's patients and that the contestants didn't get much time to interact with Cuban.

Dominic's team is next, going in the afternoon.  They start off by taking a flashy Hummer limousine to the arcade Dave & Buster's.  Cuban is very excited because he hasn't been to an arcade since he was fifteen and has a great time, capping the time off with a mid-day beer with the team.

Shawn's team goes last late in the afternoon.  They take Cuban to the Speed Zone go-kart park.  Cuban again has a good time, but following racing, the team takes Mark to a sky-shot ride, which shoots riders into the sky on a giant slingshot.  Mark, however, is afraid of heights and refuses to get on it.  The team doesn't have a backup plan and they end up wasting the remaining 45 minutes of Cuban's time and, consequently, lose the competition.

The four members of Shawn's team are then put before Cuban's "Board of Advisors" - a panel of three second-graders - who will determine which two members will stay in the game and which two will have to leave.  After the three second-graders ask the four contestants a series of questions, they determine to eliminate William and Mario.

External links
 

American Broadcasting Company original programming
2000s American reality television series
2004 American television series debuts
2004 American television series endings
English-language television shows